Amblyseius stramenti is a species of mite in the family Phytoseiidae.

References

stramenti
Articles created by Qbugbot
Animals described in 1965
Taxa named by Wolfgang Karg